All is True can refer to:

An alternative name for William Shakespeare's play Henry VIII
All is True (film), a 2018 Kenneth Branagh film